Patrick Ndururi Kinaga (21 January 1969 – 25 October 2009) was a Kenyan middle-distance runner who specialized in the 800 metres. On 13 August 1997 he ran a personal best of 1:42.62 minutes at the Weltklasse Zürich meeting. This time ranks him in the top twenty fastest people in history over this distance.

His greatest performance on the global stage came at the 1997 World Championships in Athletics, where he finished seventh in the final. He was the 400 metres bronze medallist at the 1995 Military World Games. He won three international 800 m medals in his career: silver at the 1997 IAAF Grand Prix Final, gold at the 1998 Goodwill Games, and silver at the 1998 African Championships in Athletics.

He was coached and mentored by five times world cross country champion John Ngugi at his camp Mt. Kenya High Altitude Training Camp, where athletes like Samuel Kamau Wanjiru the Olympic marathon champion were trained.

Ndururi was from the Gatunyu village, Mugomoini sub-location, Gatanga District. His parents were Naftali Kinaga and Joyce Njoki. Ndururi was married to Florence Wanjiru with one child. Ndururi died on 25 October 2009 due to a suspected heart attack, and was buried on 3 November in his home town Thika in Central Kenya.

Achievements

References

1969 births
2009 deaths
Kenyan male middle-distance runners
Kenyan male sprinters
People from Kiambu County
Goodwill Games medalists in athletics
Competitors at the 1998 Goodwill Games
20th-century Kenyan people